Geoffrey Colin Richardson (born 17 April 1949) is an Australian former national representative rugby league and rugby union player - a dual-code international.

Rugby union
His club rugby was played with the Army Club, Townsville before moving to Brisbane in 1972 and the Teachers club from where he continued to be selected to the Wallabies. His Test debut was against the Springboks in Sydney in July 1971. He represented in nine Tests from 1971 to 1973 and captained Australia in one minor match in 1971.

New South Wales teams
 Goulburn RUFC (ACT/Monaro Rugby Union) 1968, 69
 ACT Representative Team - NSWCRU Country Week 1968, 69
 New South Wales 1969

Queensland teams
 Army Rugby Club (Townsville & District Rugby Union) 1970, 71
 TDRU Representative Team - QCRU Country Carnival 1971
 Queensland Country 1971
 Teachers Rugby Club (Brisbane) 1972, 73
 Queensland 1971, 72, 73

Rugby league
Switching to the professional code in 1974 Richardson played his club football in the Brisbane Rugby League premiership with the Western Suburbs club. He gained representative honours for Queensland and Australia in the first and second Test of 1974 against the visiting Great Britain side. His international rugby league debut against Great Britain in Brisbane in June 1974 saw him become Australia's 37th dual code rugby international following Steve Knight and preceding Ray Price. After Australia's 16-11 loss in the second Test Richardson was replaced in the third by Tim Pickup. He did not regain Test selection.

Richardson played at five-eighth in back-to-back Brisbane Rugby League grand final victories in 1975 and 1976.

Queensland teams
 Western Suburbs (Brisbane) 1974, 75•, 76•
 Queensland 1974, 75
• BRL 'A' Grade Premiers

Sources

Footnotes

Bibliography
 Howell, Max (2005) Born to Lead - Wallaby Test Captains, Celebrity Books, Auckland NZ
 Whiticker, Alan & Hudson, Glen (2006) The Encyclopedia of Rugby League Players, Gavin Allen Publishing, Sydney

External links

1949 births
Living people
Australian rugby league players
Wests Panthers players
Australia national rugby league team players
Australian rugby union players
Dual-code rugby internationals
Australia international rugby union players
Queensland rugby league team players
Rugby union players from Taree
Rugby union fly-halves